The 1958 Milan–San Remo was the 49th edition of the Milan–San Remo cycle race and was held on 19 March 1958. The race started in Milan and finished in San Remo. The race was won by Rik Van Looy.

General classification

References

1958
1958 in road cycling
1958 in Italian sport
1958 Challenge Desgrange-Colombo
March 1958 sports events in Europe